Gibbes may refer to:

People
 Gibbes, a surname
 Gibbes baronets later Osborne-Gibbes baronets, titles in the Baronetage of Great Britain

Places
 Mount Gibbes, of the Black Mountains, North Carolina, U.S.
 Gibbes, and Gibbes Bay, Saint Peter, Barbados

Other uses
 Gibbes Museum of Art, Charleston, South Carolina, U.S.

See also

William Gibbes (disambiguation)
Gibbs (disambiguation)
Gibb (disambiguation)
 Gibbes House (disambiguation)